Teliagarhi (also written as Teliagarih) is a village in Mandro CD block in Sahibganj subdivision of Sahibganj district in the Indian state of Jharkhand.

History
Teliagarhi became the main gateway for Muslim armies coming from northern India and marching to Bengal from the 13th century. Bakhtiyar Khilji passed through Teliagarhi pass on the way to the conquest of Bengal. In 1538, Sher Shah Suri and Humayun fought a decisive battle near Teliagarhi. The rebellious Prince Khurram fought with Ibrahim Khan at Teliagarhi and Rajmahal for control of Bengal.

Teliagarhi fort was built by a Teli zamindar who converted to Islam during the rule of Shah Jahan. Maa Raksisthan temple was built near the fort in 1819.

Geography

Location

Overview
Rajmahal coalfield is shown in the map. The entire area is overwhelmingly rural with only small pockets of urbanisation.

Note: The full screen map is interesting. All places marked on the map are linked and you can easily move on to another page of your choice. Enlarge the map to see what else is there – one gets railway links, many more road links and so on.

Demographics
According to the 2011 Census of India, Teliagarih had a total population of 107, of which 58 (54%) were males and 49 (46%) were females. Population in the age range 0–6 years was 19. The total number of literate persons in Teliagarih was 46 (52.27% of the population over 6 years).

Transport
Karamtola railway station, located nearby, situated on the Sahibganj Loop, 9 km from Sahibganj.

References

Villages in Sahibganj district